Former pupils of the Edinburgh Academy in Edinburgh. They include the following individuals.

Arts and culture

Actors
 Graham Crowden
 Iain Glen, actor (EA 1965-78)
 Frank Taylor (Australian actor)

Artists, architects and designers
 Francis 'Bunty' Cadell, colourist painter.
 James Eckford Lauder, painted portraits and historical pictures, (EA 1824-8)
 Patrick Grant (designer)
 John Henry Lorimer
 Robert Lorimer
 Alan MacDougall railway engineer in Canada
 Donald Watson (artist)

Authors, poets and dramatists
 R. M. Ballantyne, children's author (EA 1835-37)
 John Crommelin-Brown, poet, headmaster (EA 1895-97)
 Gordon Honeycombe, author, playwright and stage actor, TV newscaster (EA 1947-55)
 Andrew Lang, Scottish poet and novelist (EA 1854-61)
 Alan Melville (writer), (EA 1925-27)
 Sarah Pinborough, young adult fiction and adult thriller writer (EA 1988-90)
 Robert Louis Stevenson, writer (EA 1861-63)
 J. I. M. Stewart (as Michael Innes), university professor and mystery writer (EA 1913-24)

Entertainers
 Nicky Campbell, radio DJ and television presenter, (EA 1966-78)
 Adam Alexander Dawson
 Magnus Magnusson, television presenter, and translator of Icelandic origins, (EA 1935-48)
 Catherine McQueen, model and TV presenter.

Music
 Guy Berryman, bass player in Coldplay
 John Burgess, piper
 Paul Jones, singer, actor and presenter, (EA 1958-60)
 Nick Keir, Musician (EA 1958-1970)

Business people
 Walter Biggar Blaikie
 Archibald Constable, publisher
 Nick Ede
 Nigel Douglas
 Mac Henderson
 Roger Jenkins (banker)
 John More Dick Peddie
 Dennis Stevenson, Baron Stevenson of Coddenham
 Wilfrid Stevenson, Baron Stevenson of Balmacara
 Will Whitehorn, president of Virgin Galactic

Clergy
Marcus Dods (theologian born 1834)
Ronnie Selby Wright
 Archibald Campbell Tait, Archbishop of Canterbury, (EA 1824-27).
 Kenneth Stevenson, Bishop of Portsmouth.
 Alexander Penrose Forbes, Bishop of Brechin, (EA 1825-32)

Convicted Criminals
 David Jenkins, convicted felon and drug smuggler (1987), Olympic athlete (EA 1958-1969)

Explorers
 Francis Cadell, explorer of the Murray River in Australia.
 Lord Francis Douglas, with Edward Whymper on the ascent of the Matterhorn, died on the descent.
 Sir James Hector, member of the Palliser Expedition, (EA 1844-45).

Lawyers and judges

 William Edmondstoune Aytoun
 John Balfour, 1st Baron Kinross
 Colin Blackburn, Baron Blackburn
 John Cameron, Lord Cameron
 Kenneth Cameron, Baron Cameron of Lochbroom
 Charles Clark (publisher)
 James Avon Clyde, Lord Clyde
 James Clyde, Baron Clyde, Lord Clyde of Briglands
 James Latham Clyde, Lord Clyde
 David Dundas, Lord Dundas
 Derek Emslie, Lord Kingarth
 Nigel Emslie, Lord Emslie, former judge on the Supreme Courts of Scotland
 Charles Falconer, Baron Falconer of Thoroton, Lord Chancellor
 Robert Finlay, 1st Viscount Finlay, Lord Chancellor
 William Gloag
 Richard Haldane, 1st Viscount Haldane, Lord Chancellor
 David Hope, Baron Hope of Craighead
 Malcolm Innes of Edingight
 Andrew Jameson, Lord Ardwall
 Alan Johnston, Lord Johnston
 Henry Keith, Baron Keith of Kinkel
 John Macdonald, Lord Kingsburgh
 Charles Murray, Lord Murray
 Charles Pearson, Lord Pearson
 William John Peterswald, Chief Commissioner of Police of the Colony of South Australia
 William Prosser, Lord Prosser
 James Reid, politician and Law Lord
 Alexander Stevenson
 Angus Stewart, Lord Stewart
 Gordon Stott, Lord Stott
Ranald Sutherland, Lord Sutherland
 Colin Sutherland, Lord Carloway
 Sir Frederick Thomson, 1st Baronet
 Robert Younger, Baron Blanesburgh
 James Stevenson McDonald, Kilmarnock

Politicians and diplomats

 Richard Burdon Haldane, 1st Viscount Haldane, Lord Chancellor, 'Father of the Territorial Army' (EA 1866-72)
 Alick Buchanan-Smith (politician)
 Tam Dalyell, Father of the House of Commons 2001-05
 Charles Falconer, Lord Falconer of Thoroton, Lord Chancellor
 Andrew Gilchrist
 Andrew Henderson Leith Fraser
 John Ernest Buttery Hotson
 David Robert Lyall
 Sir James Marjoribanks, career diplomat who presented Britain's successful application to join the European Community in 1967
 Mike Pringle (politician)
 Alexander Ramsay-Gibson-Maitland
 Sir Ninian Stephen, Governor General of Australia
 Sir Frederick Thomson, 1st Baronet
 Iain Vallance, Baron Vallance of Tummel
 James Wemyss, New Zealand member of parliament
 George Younger, 1st Viscount Younger of Leckie, (EA 1864-67)

Scientists, educators and academics

 Thomas Anderson (chemist)
 Lewis Campbell (classicist)
 Frederick M Bailey, plant collector, discoverer of Meconopsis baileyi
 Isaac Bayley Balfour, botanist (1853-1922)
 Sir George Beilby, FRS. Chemical manufacturer
 Dr Joseph Bell, now recognised as the model for Sherlock Holmes.
 John McConnell Black
 Hugh Blackburn
 Prof John Chiene, surgeon
 Peter Craigie, biblical scholar
 William Cunningham, economist
 A. R. B. Haldane
 John Scott Haldane, physiologist (EA 1870-76)
 Colin Hardie
 Andrew Fergus Hewat FRSE psychiatrist
 Fleeming Jenkin, professor of engineering, (EA 1875-81)
 Charles Kemball
 Prof. Sunil Khilnani
 Norman Boyd Kinnear
 John Michael Kosterlitz
 Robert Scott Lauder jnr., M.D.,(Edinburgh), Physician at Morningside Lunatic Asylum, etc., (EA 1852-8)
 Arthur Pillans Laurie
 Wallace Lindsay
 Aeneas James George Mackay
 Colin Mair
 James Clerk Maxwell, physicist, (EA 1841-47)
 William McNab, botanist
 Alan Munro, immunologist and master of Christ's College, Cambridge
 James Henry Skene, author, traveller and diplomat, (EA 1824-26)
 Archibald Campbell Swinton
 Peter Guthrie Tait, physicist, (EA 1841-47).
 Iain Torrance, President of Princeton Theological Seminary, (EA 1954-63)
 D'Arcy Wentworth Thompson, mathematical biologist, (EA 1870-77)
 Adrian Woodruffe-Peacock, ecologist
 Alexander Wood (physician)

Soldiers
 Frederick Marshman Bailey
 Walter Lorrain Brodie VC
 Roy Bucher
 William Frederick Cavaye
 Philip Christison
 Admiral of the Fleet Andrew Cunningham, victor of Taranto and Matapan during the Second World War
 Aylmer Haldane
 Richard Burdon Haldane, 1st Viscount Haldane, Lord Chancellor, 'Father of the Territorial Army' (EA 1866-72)
 Allan Ker VC
 Colin Mackenzie, Major-General and Chief of the General Staff of the Canadian Army
 Alastair Ogilvy
 Jock Slater, First Sea Lord
 Thomas Bland Strange

Victoria Cross recipients
Nine Edinburgh Academy alumni have received the Victoria Cross.
Colonel Thomas Cadell VC CB
Lieutenant-General Sir James Hills-Johnes VC GCB
Colonel John Adam Tytler VC CB
Captain James Dundas VC
Major John Cook (VC) VC
Colonel Edward Douglas Browne-Synge-Hutchinson, VC, CB  (he also attended United Services College in 1875). He was a Major when he earned his VC.
Lieutenant Colonel Walter Lorrain Brodie VC, MC
Major Allan Ebenezer Ker VC
Rear Admiral Sir Anthony Miers VC, KBE, CB, DSO & Bar

Sportsmen

 James Balfour-Melville (1882–1915), cricketer
 Leslie Balfour-Melville (1854–1937), an outstanding all-round amateur sportsman
 Mike Blair, Scottish Rugby International
 Nigel Douglas (rugby)
 Tom Brown (rugby union)
 Charles Campbell, captain of Scotland's football team in the 19th century
 Charles Campbell (footballer)
 Chris Dean (rugby union), Edinburgh Rugby and Scotland Sevens Rugby Cap
 Henry Fairweather (born 1946), cricketer
 Jamie Farndale, Scotland Rugby 7's International
 George Gallie
 Sir James Angus Gillan, Olympic oarsman, gold-medallist 1908 and 1912 (EA 1896-1905)
 Alex Harris, footballer
 Nick Hillyard, cricketer
 Gilbert Hole, cricketer and cricket administrator
 David Jenkins, Olympian athlete; 400 meter world record holder
 Hubert Johnston, cricketer
 Blair Kinghorn Rugby player, Edinburgh Rugby, Scotland u20's
 Bill Maclagan Scotland Rugby International
 William Maitland, cricketer
 Francis Moncreiff
 Robert Miln Neill Scotland and Great Britain Rugby International
 John Murray, cricketer
 Patrick Oliphant, cricketer
 Norman Noble, cricketer
 Robert Ranken, cricketer
 Ross Rennie Scotland Rugby International
 Alexander Stevenson, cricketer
 James Stevenson, cricketer
 John Guthrie Tait
 Frederick Guthrie Tait, son of Peter Guthrie Tait, soldier and gifted amateur golfer, (EA 1881-83)
 Ben Tod, cricketer and rugby player
 Bungy Watson England rugby international
 Iain Woolward, Olympian, sailing

References 

Edinburgh Academy